Fujian Anxi Tiekuanyin Women's Volleyball Club is a professional volleyball team based in Xiamen, Fujian that plays in the Chinese Volleyball League. The team now is sponsored by Anxi Tiekuanyin Group.

CVL results

Team roster 2016-2017

Former players
  Manon Flier
  Li Yan 
  Patcharee Sangmuang
  Malika Kanthong
  Pleumjit Thinkaow
  Wilavan Apinyapong
  Nicole Fawcett

References

Chinese volleyball clubs